Nowa Wieś  is a village in the administrative district of Gmina Grudziądz, within Grudziądz County, Kuyavian-Pomeranian Voivodeship, in north-central Poland. It is located in the Chełmno Land in the historic region of Pomerania.

The village has a population of 1,300.

History
During the German occupation (World War II), in 1939, Polish farmers, workers and policemen from Nowa Wieś were murdered by the German SS and Selbstschutz in the large massacre of Poles committed in nearby Białochowo as part of the Intelligenzaktion.

References

Villages in Grudziądz County